The 1983–84 season was Manchester United's 82nd season in the Football League, and their 9th consecutive season in the top division of English football. As FA Cup holders they suffered a shock exit at the hands of Third Division underdogs Bournemouth in the third round, but did reach the semi-finals of the European Cup Winners' Cup and were narrowly defeated by Juventus. They frequently led the league during the season but eventually finish fourth, having been held to a draw in 14 out of 42 games despite losing just eight times. Perhaps the most memorable game of the season was the European Cup Winners' Cup quarter-final clash with Barcelona of Spain, a side featuring Diego Maradona. After going 2–0 down in the first leg, United achieved a remarkable 3–0 win in the return leg at Old Trafford.

It was the breakthrough season at the club for young striker Mark Hughes, who scored four times late in the season, and the final season at the club for midfielder Ray Wilkins who exited Old Trafford at the end of the campaign to sign for Milan. Captain Bryan Robson stayed at the club despite an attempt to sign him by Italian side Juventus.

The close season saw the arrival of wingers Gordon Strachan and Jesper Olsen and the departure of Lou Macari to Swindon Town.

FA Charity Shield

First Division

FA Cup

League Cup

Cup Winners' Cup

Squad statistics

References

Manchester United F.C. seasons
Manchester United